Llaushë is a village in the Mitrovicë district of Kosovo.

Notes

References

Villages in Skenderaj